The Syrian Super Cup is a Syrian association football trophy contested in an annual match between the champions of Syrian Premier League and the winners of the Syrian Cup. It was first played in 1982, afterwards the competition is played sporadically at irregular intervals.

List of finals

Notes:
  Finished as League Runner-up.

Performances

Performance by club

Performance by city

Performance by representative

Venues

All-time top goalscorers

Notes

References

External links
 Results

Super Cup
Syria